Malad (Pronunciation: [maːlaːɖ]) is a suburb located in North Mumbai. Malad has a railway station on the Western line (Mumbai Suburban Railway) of the Mumbai Suburban Railway, lying between Kandivali station to the north and Goregaon station to the south. The railway tracks of the Western Line divide Malad into Malad (West) and Malad (East). It has a large Marathi population. Also located in Malad is a prominent office commercial space extending from the back of the two prominent shopping malls Inorbit Mall & Infiniti Mall. Marve Beach and Aksa Beach are Located in Malad.

History
In the 16th century, Malad consisted of a number of villages including Orlem (also known as Valnai), Kharodi, Rathodi, Malwani, Marve, Aksa, Madh and Chincholi. The other old settlements in Malad were villages occupied by the local SKP community, East Indian Community, Bhandaris and Kolis - who are recognized as the original native inhabitants of Mumbai, these communities are still living in Malad.

The Purav's and Pathare's from the SKP community are still living in Chincholi bunder and Malvani village area of Malad. The East Indian community along with Koli community is living in the Coastal areas.

One of the Oldest temple in Malad is Lord Hanuman temple situated in Malvani Village which is more than a century old constructed by Purav Family of Malvani Village in early 19th Century.

Malvani village is also known for its grand Hanuman jayanti festival and for numerous Lord Hanuman temples.

Harbadevi Temple which is a 12th Century temple is located in Madh Island, as per historical evidence and writings in the temple it was also attacked during World War II.

Ahead of Aksa Beach, is the hidden and relatively lesser known vital landmark, which is the Malad Fort a.k.a. Madh Fort. The fort overlooks the Arabian Sea and was captured by the Maratha Empire, from the Portuguese in 1739. INS Hamla, a logistics and training establishment of the Indian navy is situated in Malad.

Educational institutes 
 Witty International School
 Jyotsna Dhirajlal Talakchand High School
 Navjeevan Vidyalaya High School
 Fatima Devi English High School
 Kendriya Vidyalaya INS Hamla
 St Joseph's High School 
 St Mary's School 
 Children's Academy group of schools (Bachani Nagar branch)
 Carmel of St. Joseph School (SSC, Malad) 
 St. Anthony's High School
 Dr. Sarvepalli Radhakrishnan International School
 Veer Bhagat Singh International School
 N.L. Dalmia College
 Durgadevi Saraf Institute of Management Studies
 Mahindra Academy
 Lords Universal College
 Ryan International School (ICSE/CBSE, Malad)
 Seth Juggilal Poddar Academy
 Balbharti School
 Gyanganga Infotech Computer Institute (Malad East)
 St. Anne's High School & Junior College
 Ramzan Ali English School & Junior College
 Kala Vidyalaya school & Polytechnic
 Malad West School in Mumbai, Vibgyor Rise
 Utkarsh Mandir high school
 St Jude's High School
 Infant Jesus school
 St. George High School
 Mother Teressa High School
 Atharva educational complex Mumbai
 Fr.Agnelo High School
 Nagindas Khandwala College

Demographics
The approximate population is approximately 946,000 with an additional day-time floating population of 100,000. Malad which in its entirety (East & West region) comes under the P-North ward which is the most populated ward in the city, according to the census 2011. The suburb has a large Rich and Upper Middle class Marathi population.

Hospitals
 Thunga Hospital (Malad West)
 Lifeline Hospital (Malad West)
 Suchak Hospital (Malad East)
 Ashoka Hospital (Malad East)
 Sanjeevani Hospital (Malad East)
 Balajee Hospital (Malad East)
 S.K. Patil Mahanagarpalika General Hospital (Malad East)
 MW DESAI Municipal Hospital ANC OPD (Malad East)
 Zenith Hospital (Malad West)
 Lotus Multispeciality Hospital (Malad West)
 Surana Hospital and Research Centre (Orlem, Church, Malad West)
 Sun Multispeciality Hospital
 The Children's Hospital Mumbai (Kanchpada, Malad West)
 Vivanta Multi Speciality Hospital  (Sunder Nagar, Malad West)

Beaches
 Marve Beach
 Aksa Beach
 Danapani Beach
 Erangal Beach
 Madh Beach
 Manori Beach

References

Suburbs of Mumbai